737 most commonly refers to:

 Boeing 737, an American narrow-body passenger airplane
 Boeing 737 Classic
 Boeing 737 MAX
 Boeing 737 Next Generation
 AD 737, a year in the common era
 737 BC, a year
 737 (number), a number

737 may also refer to:

Arts, entertainment, and media

Literature
 Minuscule 737, a Greek minuscule manuscript

Television
 Pinoy Big Brother: 737, a twelfth season of Pinoy Big Brother
 "Seven Thirty-Seven", a season 2 episode of Breaking Bad

Places
 737 area code, a telephone area code in Austin, Texas, United States
 737 Park Avenue, a residential building in New York City, New York, United States
 737 Vancouver Street, a Victorian-style home in Victoria, British Columbia, Canada

Military
 737 Naval Air Squadron, a Royal Navy helicopter squadron
 737th Expeditionary Airlift Squadron, a provisional United States Air Force unit
 USS Kentucky (SSBN-737), an Ohio-class ballistic missile submarine

Science and technology
 737 Arequipa, a minor planet
 ABT-737, a small molecule drug
 Code page 737, a Greek language code page

Transportation

Automobiles
 Enranger 737, a Chinese compact MPV
 Mazda 737C, a Japanese prototype racing car

Train types
 737 series, a Japanese train type on order by Hokkaido Railway Company (JR Hokkaido)

Roads and routes

Canada
 Saskatchewan Highway 737

Costa Rica
 National Route 737 (Costa Rica), a highway in Alajuela

United States
 Louisiana Highway 737
 Pennsylvania Route 737
 Farm to Market Road 737, two different former roads in Texas